Of the languages of Tunisia, Arabic is the sole official language according to the Tunisian Constitution.

The vast majority of the population today speaks Tunisian Arabic (also called Derja) as their native language, which is mutually intelligible to a limited degree with other Maghrebi Arabic dialects. Most inhabitants are also literate in Modern Standard Arabic (literary Arabic), which is taught at the primary and secondary education levels. A significant portion of the population can speak French to varying degrees, as French was the common language of business and administration during French rule in the region.

Eastern Berber languages are still spoken by some Tunisian minority groups, but they also speak Arabic as a second language for the most part.

Tunisian Arabic

The Tunisian Arabic is considered a variety of Arabic – or more accurately a set of dialects.

Tunisian is built upon a significant phoenician,African Romance and Neo-Punic substratum, while its vocabulary is mostly derived from Arabic and a morphological corruption of French, Italian and English. Multilingualism within Tunisia and in the Tunisian diaspora makes it common for Tunisians to code-switch, mixing Tunisian with French, Italian and English or other languages in daily speech.

Moreover, Tunisian is closely related to the Maltese language, that descended from Tunisian and Siculo-Arabic.

Berber languages
Berber languages (called "shelha" by Arabs) are mainly spoken in the villages of the south, including Chenini, Douiret, Matmata and Tamezrett. They are also spoken in some hamlets on the island of Djerba, mainly Guellala, Sedouikech and Ouirsighen.

French
During the French colonization of Tunisia, French was introduced in public institutions, most notably the education system, which became a strong vehicle for dissemination of the language. From independence, the country gradually became arabized even though the public administration and education remained bilingual. Meanwhile, knowledge of French and other European languages (such as English) is enhanced by Tunisia's proximity to Europe and by media and tourism.

The 1990s marked a turning point for the Arabization process. Science classes up to the end of middle school were Arabized in order to facilitate access to higher education and promote the Arabic language in society. Since October 1999, private establishments have been obliged to give Arabic characters twice the size of Latin characters. This rule is not always followed, however. At the same time, the public administration is required to communicate in Arabic only. In this context, the use of French seems to be in decline despite the increased number of graduates in the educational system, which leads to the fact that a good knowledge of French remains an important social marker. This is because French is widely used in the business community, intellectual domains and the spheres of natural science and medicine. Because of this, one can consider the language to have become gentrified. Thus, French in Tunisia is a prestige language.

According to recent estimates provided by the Tunisian government to the Organisation Internationale de la Francophonie, the number of French speakers in the country is estimated at 6.36 million people, or 63.6% of the population.

See also

 Demographics of Tunisia
 Deafness in Tunisia
 Arab world
 French language in the Maghreb
 Languages of Algeria
 Languages of Morocco

References

Further reading
 Gabsi, Zouhir. "Attrition and maintenance of the Berber language in Tunisia." International Journal of the Sociology of Language, September 2011. Issue 211, p. 135. ISSN 0165-2516. Available on Academic OneFile.
 Stevens, P. (1983). "Ambivalence, Modernisation and Language Attitudes: French and Arabic in Tunisia." Journal of Multilingual and Multicultural Development. Volume 4, Nos. 2 and 3, p. 101-14.

External links
 Linguistic situation in Tunisia